Liocarinia is a genus of sea snails, marine gastropod mollusks in the family Skeneidae.

Species
Species within the genus Liocarinia include:
 Liocarinia disjuncta (Hedley, 1903)

References

External links

 
Skeneidae
Monotypic gastropod genera